Utsavamelam  (The Sound of Festival) is a 1992 Indian Malayalam-language film directed by Suresh Unnithan and written by K. S. Bhasurachandran. The rivalry between two families and the unexpected middle man in these issues is the main theme of the film.

The film was a moderate success.

Plot 
Thekkumpuram and Vadakkumpuram are rival branches of an aristocratic family in the village, and the focal point for their clashes is the right over the village temple and its festivals. It is apparent that there is no near resolution of the conflict as well as no room for negotiation between them.
However, the annual festival in the village must go on and every year and it renews the confrontation between these two families and their supporters which apparently divided the village dangerously between two rivaling factions. The rights for the year's festival go to Vadakkumpuram family in a negotiation proposed by respected "Thirumeni" of the village.

Cast

Suresh Gopi as Jayadevan
Urvashi as  Kanakaprabha
Unnimary as Sreedevi
Sankaradi as Thekkumpuram Karnavar
Manoj K. Jayan as Bhagavathar
 Babu Namboothiri as Velichappadu
 Narendra Prasad as Thirumeni
 Jagathy Sreekumar as Thankappan/Manoj Kumar
Indrans as Gopalan
Mamukkoya as Nair
KPAC Lalitha as Kalyaniamma
Kollam Thulasi as Sankaran
Usha as Ashwathi
 Meena Ganesh as Aswathi's mother 
 Valsala Menon as Ammukuttyamma
Innocent as Kamalasanana Kuruppu
 Nayana as Kalyani Kutty	
 Poojappura Radhakrishnan
 Zeenath as Kanakaprabha's foster mother
 Unny Mery as Sreedevi
 N. L. Balakrishnan as Kuruppu
 Mala Aravindan
 Ravi Vallathol as Madhavankutty
 Jagannathan as Govinda Menon
 Kuthiravattam Pappu
 Alummoodan as DKP
Syama as Shalini
 Aliyar as Viswam 
 Haisham
 Kailas Nath

Soundtrack 
The film includes songs written by lyricist O. N. V. Kurup and composed by Mohan Sithara.

References

External links

1990s Malayalam-language films
Films scored by Mohan Sithara